Mole-rat (acche laal) or mole rat can refer to several groups of burrowing Old World rodents:

 Bathyergidae, a family of about 20 hystricognath species in six genera from Africa also called blesmols.
Heterocephalus glaber, the naked mole-rat.
 Spalacidae, a family of about 30 muroid species in six genera from Eurasia and northeast Africa, including:
Tachyoryctes, a genus of about 15 species from Africa;
 Blind mole rats (Spalacinae), a subfamily of about 15 living species in the genus Spalax from southeastern Europe, southwestern Asia, and northeastern Africa;
 Zokors (Myospalacinae), occasionally called mole-rats, about eight species from central and eastern Asia.
 In the family Muridae:
 Nesokia indica from southern and southwestern Asia and Egypt, also known as the short-tailed mole-rat.
 Bandicota bengalensis from southern Asia, also known as the Indian mole-rat.